BMG may refer to:

Organizations
 Music publishing companies:
 Bertelsmann Music Group, a 1987–2008 division of Bertelsmann that was purchased by Sony on October 1, 2008
 Sony BMG, a 2004–2008 joint venture of Bertelsmann and Sony that was purchased by Sony in late 2008
 Sony Music, the purchaser of Sony BMG in 2008 and owner of the rights to its catalog
 Ariola Records, sometimes known as "BMG Ariola", originally a separate company, acquired in 1987 by Bertelsmann Music Group, then by Sony BMG in 2002, then by Sony Music in 2008
BMG Rights Management, a company established in late 2008 as a joint venture between Bertelsmann and Kohlberg Kravis Roberts
 Baader-Meinhof Group, the former name of the Red Army Faction, one of the most violent and prominent left wing groups of post–World War II West Germany
 Badan Meteorologi dan Geofisika, the former name of the Indonesian Agency for Meteorology, Climatology and Geophysics
 Banco BMG, formerly known as Banco de Minas Gerais, a Brazilian bank
 Bank Mendes Gans, a Dutch bank
 Beacon Medical Group, an Irish healthcare company
 Bill & Melinda Gates Foundation, a large U.S. charitable foundation
 Blue Man Group, a (primarily American) performance art group
 Bohlen, Meyer, Gibson and Associates, an architectural firm in Indianapolis, Indiana
 Borussia Mönchengladbach, a German football club based in Mönchengladbach, North Rhine-Westphalia

Places
 Beth Medrash Govoha, a Haredi yeshiva in Lakewood Township, New Jersey
 Monroe County Airport (Indiana) (IATA code: BMG), a county-owned public-use airport

Publications
 BMG (magazine) (for banjo, mandolin, and guitar), a magazine founded in 1903 by Clifford Essex (1869–1946) of London, England

Science and technology
Bulk metallic glass (BMG), a type of alloy, amorphous metal
β2-Microglobulin (BMG) a protein
benign monoclonal gammopathy (BMG)
Bedside strip Measurement of venous/capillary blood Glucose (BMG)

Weaponry
 Browning machine gun, various machine gun designs by John Browning
 .50 BMG, a cartridge developed for the Browning .50 caliber machine gun in the late 1910s